Lorenzo Peli (born 24 January 2000) is an Italian football player. He plays for  club Pontedera on loan from Atalanta.

Club career

Atalanta
Peli is a product of Atalanta youth teams and started playing for their Under-19 squad in the 2017–18 season.

In the 2017–18 and 2018–19 seasons he was called up to the senior squad on several occasions, but did not make any appearances.

Loan to Como
He joined the newly-promoted Serie C club Como on loan in July 2019.

He made his professional Serie C debut for Como in September 2019 in a game against Renate. He substituted Alessandro Gabrielloni in the 81st minute.

Loan to Reggina
In August 2020 he went to Reggina (newly promoted to Serie B) on loan.

Return to Como
In January 2021 he returned to Como on loan. The loan was extended on 16 July 2021.

Loans to Novara and Pontedera
On 15 July 2022, Peli joined Novara on loan. The loan was terminated early on 31 January 2023. On the same day, Peli was loaned to Pontedera in Serie C.

International
In 2017 and 2018, he played several friendlies for the Italy national under-18 football team.

References

External links
 

2000 births
21st-century Italian people
People from Seriate
Footballers from Lombardy
Living people
Italian footballers
Italy youth international footballers
Association football forwards
Atalanta B.C. players
Como 1907 players
Reggina 1914 players
Novara F.C. players
U.S. Città di Pontedera players
Serie B players
Serie C players